Kaloji Narayana Rao (9 September 1914 – 13 November 2002) was an Indian poet, freedom fighter, anti-fascist and political activist of Telangana. He was awarded the Padma Vibhushan in 1992. The Telangana government honored Kaloji's birthday as Telangana Language Day.

Education and activism
Kaloji was born on 9 September 1914 in Rattihalli village in Bijapur district, Karnataka. His mother Ramabayamma hailing from Karnataka. Father Kaloji Rangarao is from Maharashtra, his elder brother, Kaloji Rameshwar Rao, an Urdu poet, played a vital role in shaping his personality. Kaloji completed his primary education from Madikonda and higher education in Warangal and Hyderabad.Kaloji is a polyglot. Although he studied Telugu from an early age, he also wrote poetry in Marathi, Kannada, Hindi and Urdu.Kaloji married Rukmini Bai in 1940.

During his student days, he was deeply influenced by and participated in popular movements of the time.  like the Arya Samaj Movement, especially in the domain of civil rights. He has also involved in Andhra Maha Sabha activities since its formation in 1934, and part of the Satyagraha, Osmania University Vandemataram, State Congress, Andhra Mahasabha (Telangana) and Library movements. Considered by many to be a freedom fighter, he was part of the freedom movement of Hyderabad State and underwent imprisonment under the Nizam.

His commitment to human rights made him an active member of the Tarkunde Committee. Although opposed to power and the trapping of office Kaloji looked upon elections as a democratic exercise. He contested thrice and got elected once as a member of the Andhra Pradesh Legislative Council. His most significant dispute was against Jalagam Vengal Rao, then Chief Minister of Andhra Pradesh, in 1977.

Honour
In September 2014, the Government of Telangana in his honour, named the Medical University, Kaloji Narayana Rao University of Health Sciences after him.

Literary works
Kaloji wrote poetry in Telugu, Urdu, Hindi and Marathi languages. In 1992, he was awarded an honorary doctorate by Kakatiya University.

Published writings

Death
Kaloji died on 13 November 2002. He donated his body for research to Kakatiya Medical College in Warangal.

References

External links
Kaloji's essay about Telangana and its dialect
etelangana.org/Kaloji_Bio.asp

1914 births
2002 deaths
Recipients of the Padma Vibhushan in arts
People from Telangana
Telugu poets
People from Warangal
Telangana Rebellion
20th-century Indian poets
Indian male poets
20th-century Indian male writers